Velké Hamry is a town in Jablonec nad Nisou District in the Liberec Region of the Czech Republic. It has about 2,600 inhabitants.

Administrative parts
The village of Bohdalovice is an administrative part of Velké Hamry.

Etymology
The town's name literally means "big hammer mills" and refers to hammer mills, which stood here probably in the 13th and 14th centuries.

Geography
It lies in the Jizera Mountains. The Kamenice River flows through the town.

History

In the area there were two hamlets called Dolení ("Lower") and Hoření ("Upper") Hamr. In 1914, the two hamlets were merged and created a new municipality named Velké Hamry. In 1926, it was promoted to a market town. In 1926, Bohdalovice and Svárov joined Velké Hamry. In 1968, Velké Hamry became a town.

Sights
The landmark of Velké Hamry is the Church of Saint Wenceslaus. It was built in the neo-Gothic style in 1915–1925.

References

External links

Cities and towns in the Czech Republic